Dominion Transmission is a natural gas pipeline that brings gas from the Dominion Cove Point LNG terminal in Maryland and gas from Ohio and Virginia into extensive natural gas storage fields in Pennsylvania and West Virginia, and also brings gas into New England. It is owned by Dominion Resources. Its FERC code is 22.

External links
Pipeline Electronic Bulletin Board

Natural gas pipelines in the United States
Natural gas pipelines in Maryland
Natural gas pipelines in Ohio
Natural gas pipelines in Virginia
Natural gas pipelines in Pennsylvania
Natural gas pipelines in West Virginia